Denise Yeung is a racing driver in the Asia Pacific Region from Hong Kong. She has raced in the 2013 TCA, finishing with a 1st and 2nd runner up placing, and the 2014 HTCC, with a 2nd runner up placing.

References

Hong Kong racing drivers
Living people
Year of birth missing (living people)
Place of birth missing (living people)